The 2021 Copa do Brasil (officially the Copa Intelbras do Brasil 2021 for sponsorship reasons) was the 33rd edition of the Copa do Brasil football competition. It was held between 9 March and 15 December 2021.

The competition was contested by 92 teams, either qualified by participating in their respective state championships (70), by the 2021 CBF ranking (10), by the 2020 Copa do Nordeste (1), by the 2020 Copa Verde (1), by the 2020 Série B (1), by the 2020 Série A (1) or those qualified for 2021 Copa Libertadores (8).

Atlético Mineiro defeated Athletico Paranaense 6–1 on aggregate in the finals to win their second title. As champions, Atlético Mineiro qualified for the 2022 Copa Libertadores group stage and the 2022 Copa do Brasil third round. As Atlético Mineiro also won the 2021 Campeonato Brasileiro Série A, they played in the 2022 Supercopa do Brasil against the 2021 Campeonato Brasileiro Série A runners-up, Flamengo.

Palmeiras were the defending champions, but they were eliminated in the third round.

Hulk (Atlético Mineiro) and Everson (Atlético Mineiro) won best player and best goalkeeper awards, respectively.

Format changes
Starting from this edition, 92 teams contest the competition. Twelve teams advance directly to the third round instead of eleven advancing to the round of 16 as the previous editions. With this change there are only three initial rounds before the round of 16.

Qualified teams
Teams in bold were qualified directly for the third round.

Format
The competition is a single-elimination tournament, the first two rounds are played as a single match and the rest are played as a two-legged ties. Twelve teams enter in the third round, which are teams qualified for 2021 Copa Libertadores (8), Série A best team not qualified for 2021 Copa Libertadores, Série B champions, Copa Verde champions and Copa do Nordeste champions. The remaining 80 teams play in the first round, the 40 winners play the second round, and the 20 winners play the third round. Finally, the sixteen third round winners advance to the round of 16.

Schedule
The schedule of the competition is as follows:

Draw

First round

Second round

Third round

Final rounds

Bracket

Round of 16

Quarter-finals

Semi-finals

Finals

Top goalscorers

References

 
2021
2021 in Brazilian football
2021 domestic association football cups